The Alliant RQ-6 Outrider unmanned aerial vehicle (UAV) was designed to provide near-real-time reconnaissance, surveillance, and target acquisition information to United States Marine Corps air/ground task forces, United States Army brigades, and deployed United States Navy units that was small enough for an entire system to be contained on two Humvees and trailer and transported on a single C-130 Hercules cargo aircraft.

The project began in 1996 and was cancelled in 1999.

The "R" is the Department of Defense designation for reconnaissance; "Q" means unmanned aircraft system. The "6" refers to its being the sixth of a series of purpose-built unmanned aircraft systems.

Specifications

See also

References

External links
RQ-6 listing in Directory of U.S. Military Rockets and Missiles

Single-engined pusher aircraft
Unmanned aerial vehicles of the United States
Alliant RQ-6 Outrider